South View can refer to:

South View LRT station, a light rail station on the Bukit Panjang LRT line in Choa Chu Kang, Singapore
Southview, Calgary, a neighborhood in Calgary, Alberta, Canada
Sylvania Southview High School, a high school in Sylvania, Ohio, United States
South View, Alberta, a summer village in Alberta, Canada